Radha Nandan Jha (Hindi: राधानंदन झा) (1929–2005)) was an Indian politician from the Congress Party who was Speaker  Bihar Vidhan Sabha and Deputy speaker, Bihar. He belonged to the Indian National Congress party and represented the Madhepur constituency in Bihar Legislative Assembly.

Radhanandan Jha was born in Lakhnaur, a village in Madhubani District of Bihar, to a freedom fighter.

Also see
List of politicians from Bihar

References

1929 births
2005 deaths
Indian National Congress politicians from Bihar
Politicians from Patna
20th-century Indian politicians
Bihar MLAs 1980–1985
Bihari politicians